Ethical issues in psychiatry are discussed in existing articles:

Issues of professional ethics in psychiatry
Anti-psychiatry 
List of medical ethics cases
Pharmaceutical marketing
Political abuse of psychiatry
Scientology and psychiatry 
Medical ethics